Tazehabad-e Bidgoli (also Romanized as Tāzehābād-e Bīdgolī; also known as Bīdgol-e ‘Olyā and Tāzehābād-e Bīdgol) is a village in Haft Ashiyan Rural District, Kuzaran District, Kermanshah County, Kermanshah Province, Iran. At the 2006 census, its population was 13, in 4 families.

References 

Populated places in Kermanshah County